Broadbent is an Old English toponymic surname deriving from the location 'Broadbent' near Oldham, Lancashire, describing "broad, bent rushes or reeds".

Notable people with the surname include:

Adele Broadbent (born 1968), New Zealand children's author
Alan Broadbent (born 1947), New Zealand–born jazz pianist and composer
Albert Broadbent (1934–2006), English footballer
Ambrose B. Broadbent (1885–1952), American lawyer and politician
Anne Broadbent, Canadian mathematician
Arthur Broadbent (1879–1958), English cricketer
Benjamin Broadbent (disambiguation), several people
Betty Broadbent (1909–1983), American woman famous for having more than 550 tattoos
Bob Broadbent (1924–1993), English cricketer
Christopher Bowers-Broadbent (born 1945), English organist and composer
Dan Broadbent (born 1985), English cricketer
Daniel Broadbent (born 1990), British footballer
Donald Broadbent (1926–1993), English psychologist
Edith Hacon née Broadbent (1875–1952) Scottish suffragist from Dornoch, a World War One nursing volunteer, as well as an international socialite.
Edward Broadbent (disambiguation), several people
Edmund Hamer Broadbent (1861–1945) English missionary and author
Ewen Broadbent (1924–1993), British civil servant
Frank Broadbent (1909–1983), English architect
Gary Broadbent (born 1976) English rugby league player
George Robert Broadbent (1863–1947), Australian cyclist and map publisher
Graham Broadbent, British film producer
Harry Broadbent (disambiguation), several people
Holly Broadbent Sr. (1894–1977), American orthodontist and father of Holly Broadbent Jr.
Holly Broadbent Jr. (1928–2009), American orthodontist and son of Holly Broadbent Sr.
Hydeia Broadbent (born 1984), American HIV activist
Jack Broadbent (born 2000), English rugby league footballer
Jack Broadbent (musician) (born 1988), British blues rock guitarist, singer, and songwriter 
Jane Broadbent, British academic
Jeffrey Broadbent (born 1944), American professor
Jillian Broadbent (born 1948), Australian businesswoman
Jim Broadbent (born 1949), English actor
Joanne Broadbent (born 1965), Australian cricketer
John Broadbent (disambiguation), several people
J. Leslie Broadbent (1891–1935), American religious leader
Kendall Broadbent (1837–1911) English-Australian zoologist and explorer
Matthew Broadbent (born 1990), Australian rules footballer 
Michael Broadbent (1927–2020), English wine critic and auctioneer
Paul Broadbent (born 1968), English rugby league player
Peter Broadbent (disambiguation), several people
Punch Broadbent (1892–1971), Canadian ice hockey player
Reuben Broadbent (1817–1909), American architect
Richard Broadbent (born 1953), English businessman
Robert Broadbent (1904–1986), Australian cyclist
Russell Broadbent (born 1950), Australian politician
Sylvia M. Broadbent (1932–2015), American anthropologist
Thomas Broadbent (disambiguation), several people
William Broadbent (disambiguation), several people
Walter Broadbent (1868–1951), English physician

See also
Broadbent Arena, a multi-purpose arena in Louisville, Kentucky
Broadbent, Oregon

References

English-language surnames